Cedric Bucknall (2 May 1849 in Bath – 12 December 1921), was an English organist and botanist.

Life

He was the son of John Bucknall and Elizabeth Bassett. He married Abbie Cecilia Frye on 27 April 1873 in West Hackney.

Children:
Janet Mary Bucknall b. 1874 in Southwell
Arthur Bucknall b. 1875
Basil Charles Bucknall b. 1877
Dorothea Cecilia Bucknall b. 1879
Constance Caroline Bucknall b. 1881
Harold Bucknall b. 1882
Cedric Gordon Bucknall b. 1885

He was buried in Cranford Cemetery, Westbury on Trym, Bristol.

Career

He held posts of: 
Assistant organist at St Matthias' Church, Stoke Newington under William Henry Monk
Assistant Organist at King's College London
Organist of St. Thomas' Church, Clapton 1870 - 1872
Organist of Southwell Minster 1873 - 1876
Organist of All Saints' Church, Clifton, Bristol

Botany
He was a distinguished amateur botanist, using every opportunity to travel across Europe and collect plants, which he then catalogued at leisure once home. His obituarist James Walter White intimates that Bucknall's original enthusiasm for music waned with the monotony of his jobs, and his real passion was for science, particularly botany. He travelled to "Carinthia, the Apennines, Naples, Sicily, the Baleares, and Southern Spain", in a typical fortnight amassing four hundred species. Fungi of the Bristol District described 1431 species, many of which he illustrated himself, and "100 of these were new to Britain or to science".

References

Cathedral organists
1849 births
1921 deaths
People from Bath, Somerset
19th-century British botanists